Sumatar Harabesi (also, Sumatar Ruins or simply, Sumatar) was an ancient watering place for semi-nomadic peoples located in the Tektek Mountains,  southeast of Urfa (Edessa, Mesopotamia) and  northeast of Harran, in modern-day Turkey. A now deserted oasis, it consists of a set of ruins and tombs situated around a central mount of rock  in height and width. 

A series of Syriac inscriptions dating to the 2nd and 3rd centuries CE have been found at the site. Inscriptions that refer to the "Lord of the gods," are thought to be references to Sin. In nearby Edessa, worship of Sin, who was also the main deity in Harran, extended back to the beginning of the 1st millennium BCE, and continued until some time in the 4th century CE when solar worship began to predominate.

Sumatar is also described as, "the seat of the governors of 'Arab," who derived their authority from Sin. Five of the Syriac inscriptions at Sumatar Harabesi refer to "the 'Arab", only one of which has been dated (circa 165 CE). Jan Rëtso writes that these inscriptions confirm the presence of Arabs in the area around Edessa, as mentioned twice in the writings of Pliny the Elder. The governors of the 'Arab were thought to be members of the Edessene royal family, or closely related to them, appointed by Sin to look after the "blessed mountain" that served as his sanctuary. There, these religio-political officials had altars and baetyls erected in the god's honour. A large cave at Sumatar, known as Pognon's cave, is decorated with a horned pillar, Sin's symbol.

See also
Kingdom of Hatra

References

Bibliography

Oases
Arab history
History of Turkey